Boys Nxt Door (International title: Boys Next Door) is a Philippine television situational comedy series broadcast by GMA Network. Directed by Jun Lana, it stars Marky Cielo, Aljur Abrenica, Mart Escudero and Joseph Bitangcol. It premiered on June 24, 2007. The series concluded on January 13, 2008 with a total of 31 episodes.

Cast and characters

Main cast
 Marky Cielo as Buboy
 Glaiza de Castro as Sari
 Jennica Garcia as Summer and Winter
 Mart Escudero as Atom
 Aljur Abrenica as Migs
 Kris Bernal as Coffee
 Stef Prescott as Isabel
 Rich Asuncion as Winona
 Jesi Corcuera as Milo
 Kiko Junio as Dec Dec
 Mark Herras as Zeki
 Paulo Avelino as Peter
 Patrick Garcia as Karlo
 Sheena Halili as Queenie
 Jan Manual as Raffy
 Ahron Villena as Preston
 Ailyn Luna as Margareth
 Joseph Bitangcol as King

Recurring cast
 Benjie Paras as Badong
 Janice de Belen as Ms. Malinis
 Rio Locsin as Myrna
 John Arcilla as Buboy's Dad
 Eunice "Charming" Lagusad as Nikki
 Justin Plummer as Jiro

Accolades

References

External links
 

2007 Philippine television series debuts
2008 Philippine television series endings
Filipino-language television shows
GMA Network original programming
Philippine comedy television series
Television series about teenagers